The Thraustochytrium mitochondrial code (translation table 23) is a genetic code found in the mitochondria hbuhu u ueurhrthhof the labyrinthulid protist  Thraustochytrium aureum. The mitochondrial genome was sequenced by the Organelle Genome Megasequencing Program.

Code

Differences from the standard code
It is the similar to the bacterial code (translation table 11) but it contains an additional stop codon (TTA) and also has a different set of start codons.

Systematic range and comments
 Mitochondria of Thraustochytrium aureum.

See also
 List of genetic codes

References

External links
 Organelle Genome Megasequencing Program

Molecular genetics
Gene expression
Protein biosynthesis